Christabel may refer to:

Christabel (poem), a lengthy poem by Samuel Taylor Coleridge
Christabel (film), a 2001 experimental feature by James Fotopoulos based on the poem
Christabel, a 1998 lesbian Gothic romance novel by Karin Kallmaker inspired by the Samuel Taylor Coleridge poem
Christabel (TV series), a 1988 British drama by Dennis Potter, about an English woman married to a German lawyer in Nazi Germany
Christabel LaMotte, a character in the novel Possession: A Romance
2695 Christabel (1979 UE), a main-belt asteroid discovered in 1979
Lake Christabel, a small lake of New Zealand
USS Christabel (SP-162), a United States Navy patrol vessel of World War I

People with the given name Christabel
Christabel, pseudonymous Irish poet, real name Mary Downing (c.1815–1881)
Christabel Baxendale (1886–1953), English violinist and composer
Christabel Bielenberg (1909–2003), Anglo-Irish-German non-fiction writer
Christabel Chamarette (born 1948), Greens Western Australia Senator for Western Australia
Christabel Cockerell (1860–1903), British artist, wife of Sir George Frampton
Christabel Rose Coleridge (1843–1921), English novelist
Christabel Marshall (1871–1960), British campaigner for women's suffrage, a playwright and author
Christabel Pankhurst (1880–1958), British suffragette
Christabel Elizabeth Robinson MBE (1898–1988), New Zealand teacher, vocational guidance and community worker

English feminine given names